Vaanee (Dhivehi: ވާނީ) is one of the inhabited islands of Dhaalu Atoll.

History
The island was highly affected by the Boxing Day Tsunami of 2004.

Geography

Demography
Following the 2004 tsunami, only a very few families remain on the island, with the rest living on the nearby island of Kudahuvadhoo.

References

Islands of the Maldives